Jacob Lubertus "Jaco" Geurts (born 11 July 1970 in Voorthuizen) is a Dutch politician and former swineherd. As a member of the Christian Democratic Appeal (CDA) he was a member of the municipal council of Barneveld from March 2006 until October 2012 and has been an MP since 20 September 2012.

Geurts is married and lives in Voorthuizen.

References

External links 
 J.L. (Jaco) Geurts, Parlement.com

1970 births
Living people
21st-century Dutch politicians
Christian Democratic Appeal politicians
Dutch farmers
Dutch Protestants
Members of the House of Representatives (Netherlands)
Municipal councillors in Gelderland
People from Barneveld
20th-century Dutch people